Gimenells i el Pla de la Font is a municipality in Segrià, Catalonia, Spain, made up of the settlements of Gimenells and the smaller el Pla de la Font. It has an area of 55.8 square kilometres and in 2011 had a population of 1,169. The mayor is Dante Pérez Berenguer.

References

External links
 Municipal Website
 Government data pages 

Municipalities in Segrià